Giuseppe Di Vittorio (11 August 1892 – 3 November 1957), also known as Nicoletti, was an Italian trade union leader and Communist politician. He was one of the most influential trade union leaders of the labour movement after World War I.

Early life
Giuseppe Di Vittorio was born in Cerignola, Apulia, into a family of poor agricultural day laborers. After his father's death, Di Vittorio was forced to leave school and work as a day laborer. He joined the May 1904 general strike during which five workers were killed by troops in Cerignola. Di Vittorio was strongly influenced by the growth of peasants' organizations and the spread of socialist ideas, giving rise to his participation in the local young socialist organization in Cerignola. He was radicalised by affiliating with the national Federazione Giovanile Socialista (Federation of Young Socialists), led by syndicalists in opposition to the official Italian Socialist Party's youth federation. His involvement in the socialist and labour movement grew, and 1911 he became chairman of the Camera del Lavoro in Minervino Murge.

As a native of the Mezzogiorno, Di Vittorio became involved in the union plans for solving the region's acute problems in the manner illustrated by the Fasci Siciliani in final decade of the 19th century. A partisan of insurgence, Di Vittorio became a leader of an anarcho-syndicalist Unione Sindacale Italiana (USI), after its formation in 1912. After the Red Week a number of arrest warrants were issued against him, leading to his escape to Lugano, Switzerland in June 1914; he would return ten months later, when the government issued a general amnesty.

While the majority of the USI opposed militarism Randolfo Pacciardi claimed that Di Vittorio belonged to a minority of left-wingers, like Alceste De Ambris and Filippo Corridoni, who supported irredentist claims and advocated Italy's entry into World War I. Di Vittorio later denied this, but there is a pro-war article under his name appearing on Il Popolo d'Italia in June 1915. He served in the conflict in a Bersaglieri unit, and was discharged in 1916 after having been gravely wounded.

Opposition to Fascism

In 1921 he was elected to Parliament in the lists of the Italian Socialist Party (PSI). In 1924 he joined the Communist Party of Italy, but failed to be re-elected. Di Vittorio was also a member of the militant anti-fascist organisation Arditi del Popolo.

The new situation after the rise to power of fascism and the March on Rome made him an enemy of Benito Mussolini's regime. In May 1927 he was sentenced in absentia to twelve years of imprisonment for subversive propaganda by the Special Tribunal for the Defense of the State. He managed to flee to France, and later lived in the Soviet Union from 1928 to 1930, where he represented the dissolved General Confederation of Labour in the Profintern as well as being Italy's representative in the Krestintern. Afterwards he returned to Paris, where he was a member of the Politburo of the Italian Communist Party.

He joined the Republican side fighting Francisco Franco's forces during the Spanish Civil War, as Political Commissar of the XI International Brigade. After the fall of the Republic, he headed the board of a Paris-based antifascist newspaper, La Voce degli Italiani''.

In 1941 he was arrested by German authorities in France on a request from Fascist Italy, and held in internal exile on Ventotene.

Post-war years
In 1944 Di Vittorio, along with Socialist and Catholic union leaders, agreed to re-establish CGIL as a representative of all currents of trade unionism in Italy, including Communists, Socialist, Christian Democrats, and anarcho-syndicalists. He was elected union secretary the following year.

As a union representative he sat on the National Council, an advisory body created to fulfill the role of a provisional legislature from September 1945 to June 1946. In 1946 he was elected to the Constituent Assembly as a member of the Communist Party, and would later be re-elected as a member of the new Parliament in 1948 and 1957.

With the onset of the Cold War and the breakdown of the alliance between the main anti-fascist parties, particularly the Christian Democracy and the Italian Communist Party, the organisation suffered internal divisions. When a right-wing student attempted to assassinate Communist leader Palmiro Togliatti in July 1948, CGIL called a general strike and street protests during which widespread rioting occurred. After this event the Christian Democrats within the union left to establish the Confederazione Italiana Sindacati Lavoratori (CISL). They were followed in May 1949 by supporters of the Italian Democratic Socialist Party, who left to form what would become the Unione Italiana del Lavoro (UIL). These three organisations continue to be Italy's main labour unions.

During the Hungarian Revolution of 1956 he clashed with Togliatti over the CGIL's statements of support for the Hungarian insurgents. According to Antonio Giolitti this position was supported by Di Vittorio himself during private meetings, and archival documents show that the CGIL secretary faced pressure from Community Party leadership to retract the statements.

Di Vittorio continued leading CGIL as Italy's largest union with the backing of the Communist and Socialist Parties until his death from heart attack in 1957. He was also a longtime leader of the World Federation of Trade Unions. His strong charisma made him the most popular myth of the Italian workers. His funeral was attended by more than three million people coming to Rome from all over Italy.

Notes

References

External links

1892 births
1957 deaths
People from Cerignola
Italian Socialist Party politicians
Italian Communist Party politicians
Deputies of Legislature XXVI of the Kingdom of Italy
Members of the National Council (Italy)
Members of the Constituent Assembly of Italy
Deputies of Legislature I of Italy
Deputies of Legislature II of Italy
Politicians of Apulia
Italian syndicalists
Italian military personnel of World War I
Italian people of the Spanish Civil War
Italian resistance movement members
Exiled Italian politicians